Diana Starkova is a French beauty queen of Monegasque origin, who won Miss Europe beauty pageant. She is a student of Paris-Sorbonne University. of History of Art and Archeology department.

Biography
Diana was born on December 29, 1998, in La Colle, Monaco. Diana's career started from Elite Model Look contest.

Miss Europe
Diana career started when she was appointed to represent France at Miss Europe beauty pageant.
Diana won Miss Europe title representing France. She bested 34 European delegates and was crowned with tiara signed by Chopard which is set with 678 diamonds mounted on 130 grams of gold. The centerpiece is a rare dark heart-shaped 26.40 carat diamond in white gold. Crown estimated at 350,000 EUR and previously worn by Miss Europe winners since 2003. With the title Starkova received a contract of 2 500 000 EUR and professional representation by the Miss Europe Organization, tiara with 678 diamonds mounted on 130 grams of gold signed by Chopard and estimated 350 000 EUR, diamond jewelry set matching to the crown and watch by Chopard, 650 000 EUR cash prize, one-year supply of hair-care products and tools from Kerastase Haircare, a shoe wardrobe from Christian Louboutin, swimwear by La Perla, extensive travel representing sponsors, private jet transportation for one year, evening gown wardrobe by Elie Saab, a year's worth of skincare products from La Prairie Skincare.
. During her reign Diana represented Dolce Gabbana, been a guest of Cannes Film Festival, Venice Film Festival and also been awarded Supermodel of the Year.

Awards

Top-10 Most Beautiful Women in the World
Diana is leading the list of Top-10 Most Beautiful Women in the World by portal KizlarSoruyour.

References

Living people
Monegasque emigrants to France
1998 births
French female models
Models from Paris
French beauty pageant winners
Miss Europe winners
Miss Europe